Reecy L. Dickson (born October 24, 1944) is an American Democratic politician. She was a member of the Mississippi House of Representatives from the 42nd District, being first elected in 1992 before losing renomination in 2015.

References

1944 births
Living people
People from Macon, Mississippi
Women state legislators in Mississippi
Democratic Party members of the Mississippi House of Representatives
21st-century American women